James Dalis Davies (6 December 1926 – 15 August 2010) was an Australian rules footballer who played for Swan Districts in the West Australian National Football League (WANFL) and Carlton in the Victorian Football League (VFL).

Davies won a Sandover Medal with Swan Districts in 1944 and played with them until being recruited by Carlton for the 1949 season. After two seasons in the VFL he returned to Western Australia to play for Claremont.

After retiring from playing football, he became involved in the administration of the game, culminating in becoming chairman of the WANFL in 1975.  He was also the Director-General of the WA education department.

His son Craig Davies represented Australia in field hockey.

References

External links

1926 births
2010 deaths
VFL/AFL players born outside Australia
Carlton Football Club players
Swan Districts Football Club players
Claremont Football Club players
West Perth Football Club players
Sandover Medal winners
Australian rules footballers from Western Australia
Welsh emigrants to Australia